Franciscus Jurgens (29 January 1869 – 26 March 1941) was a Dutch sports shooter. He competed in the team clay pigeon event at the 1920 Summer Olympics. His younger brother Emile Jurgens also competed for the Netherlands in shooting at the 1912 and 1920 Summer Olympics.

References

External links
 

1869 births
1941 deaths
Dutch male sport shooters
Olympic shooters of the Netherlands
Shooters at the 1920 Summer Olympics
Sportspeople from Oss